Marvin Romeo Kwasie Zeegelaar (born 12 August 1990) is a Dutch professional footballer who plays for Italian club Udinese Calcio as a left-back or a left midfielder.

Club career

Early years
Born in Amsterdam of Surinamese descent, Zeegelaar finished his formation with local AFC Ajax. He made his competitive debut on 12 November 2008, coming on as a substitute for Siem de Jong in a 1–0 away loss against FC Volendam in the third round of the KNVB Cup.

In the 2011 January transfer window, Zeegelaar was loaned to fellow Eredivisie club SBV Excelsior, appearing regularly and helping his team avoid relegation in the playoffs. In the summer, he signed a four-year contract with RCD Espanyol in Spain, being assigned to the B reserves.

Zeegelaar joined Süper Lig side Elazığspor in 2012. In September of the following year, he moved to Blackpool of the English Championship on loan.

Portugal
In the summer of 2014, Zeegelaar signed a two-year contract with Rio Ave F.C. from the Portuguese Primeira Liga. He made his debut in the competition on 21 September, playing the second half of the 1–2 home defeat to F.C. Arouca. He finished his first season with 25 matches and one goal, helping to a final tenth position.

With only six months to go before he became a free agent, Rio Ave accepted Sporting CP's bid of €400.000 in November 2015, and Zeegelaar penned a three-and-a-half-year deal which became effective in the following transfer window. In his only full season, he made 26 appearances in all competitions to help to a final third position, battling for position with Brazilian Jefferson.

Watford
On 31 August 2017, Watford signed Zeegelaar on a four-year contract. He made his Premier League debut on 19 November, playing the full 90 minutes in a 2–0 home win over West Ham United.

Udinese
Zeegelaar joined Italian Serie A team Udinese Calcio on 10 January 2019, on a five-month loan. One year later, he agreed to a permanent deal running until 30 June 2022.

On 7 March 2023, after being without a club for half a year, Zeegelaar returned to Udinese on a deal until the end of the season.

International career
In November 2016, 26-year-old Zeegelaar received his first call-up to the senior Netherlands squad, for matches against Belgium and Luxembourg.

Career statistics

References

External links
Stats at Voetbal International 

1990 births
Living people
Dutch sportspeople of Surinamese descent
Dutch footballers
Footballers from Amsterdam
Association football defenders
Association football midfielders
Eredivisie players
AFC Ajax players
Excelsior Rotterdam players
Tercera División players
RCD Espanyol B footballers
Süper Lig players
Elazığspor footballers
Premier League players
English Football League players
Blackpool F.C. players
Watford F.C. players
Primeira Liga players
Rio Ave F.C. players
Sporting CP footballers
Serie A players
Udinese Calcio players
Dutch expatriate footballers
Expatriate footballers in Spain
Expatriate footballers in Turkey
Expatriate footballers in England
Expatriate footballers in Portugal
Expatriate footballers in Italy
Dutch expatriate sportspeople in Spain
Dutch expatriate sportspeople in Turkey
Dutch expatriate sportspeople in England
Dutch expatriate sportspeople in Portugal
Dutch expatriate sportspeople in Italy